"Caro" is an afropop song collaboratively recorded by Nigerian singers L.A.X and Wizkid. Released as the first official recording by Starboy Entertainment, the song was added as a bonus on Wizkid's album Ayo.

Music video
The music video for "Caro" was shot and directed in the United Kingdom by Moe Musa. It was uploaded onto YouTube on 20 August 2013.

Reception
"Caro" received frequent airplay and was met with positive reviews. The song was nominated in the "Song of the Year" category at the 2013 African Muzik Magazine Awards, "Hottest Single of the Year" category at the 2014 Nigeria Entertainment Awards, and "Best Pop Single" category at the 2014 edition of The Headies.

Awards and nominations

References

External links

2013 songs
L.A.X (musician) songs
Wizkid songs
Yoruba-language songs
Songs written by Wizkid
Nigerian afropop songs